Bershad Raion was one of raions of Vinnytsia Oblast, located in southwestern Ukraine. The administrative center of the raion was the town of Bershad. The raion was abolished and its territory was merged into Haisyn Raion on 18 July 2020 as part of the administrative reform of Ukraine, which reduced the number of raions of Vinnytsia Oblast to six. The last estimate of the raion population was

References

Former raions of Vinnytsia Oblast
1920 establishments in Russia
Ukrainian raions abolished during the 2020 administrative reform